Jersey City is the second-most populous city in the U.S. state of New Jersey, after Newark. It is largest city and county seat of Hudson County As of the 2020 United States census, the city's population was 292,449, an increase of 44,852 (+18.1%) from the 2010 census count of 247,597, in turn an increase of 7,542 (+3.1%) from the 240,055 enumerated at the 2000 census. The Census Bureau's Population Estimates Program calculated that the city's population was 283,927 in 2021, ranking the city the 75th-most-populous in the country.

Constituting part of the New York metropolitan area, Jersey City is bounded on the east by the Hudson River and Upper New York Bay and on the west by the Hackensack River and Newark Bay. Jersey City shares significant mass transit connections with Manhattan. Redevelopment of the Jersey City waterfront has made the city one of the largest centers of banking and finance in the United States and has led to the district and city being nicknamed Wall Street West. By the early 2020s, the construction of residential skyscrapers made median rental rates the highest of any city in the United States.

History

Lenape and New Netherland

The land comprising what is now Jersey City was inhabited by the Lenape, a collection of Native American tribes (later called Delaware Indian). In 1609, Henry Hudson, seeking an alternate route to East Asia, anchored his small vessel Halve Maen (English: Half Moon) at Sandy Hook, Harsimus Cove and Weehawken Cove, and elsewhere along what was later named the North River. After spending nine days surveying the area and meeting its inhabitants, he sailed as far north as Albany. The contemporary flag of the city is a variation on the Prince's Flag from the Netherlands. The stripes are blue, white and yellow, with the center of the flag showing the city seal, depicting Hudson's ship, the Half Moon, and other modern vessels.

By 1621, the Dutch West India Company was organized to manage this new territory and in June 1623, New Netherland became a Dutch province, with headquarters in New Amsterdam. Michael Reyniersz Pauw received a land grant as patroon on the condition that he would establish a settlement of not fewer than fifty persons within four years. He chose the west bank of the Hudson River and purchased the land from the Lenape. This grant is dated November 22, 1630, and is the earliest known conveyance for what are now Hoboken and Jersey City. Pauw, however, was an absentee landlord who neglected to populate the area and was obliged to sell his holdings back to the Company in 1633. That year, a house was built at Communipaw for Jan Evertsen Bout, superintendent of the colony, which had been named Pavonia (the Latinized form of Pauw's name, which means "peacock"). Shortly after, another house was built at Harsimus Cove and became the home of Cornelius Van Vorst, who had succeeded Bout as superintendent, and whose family would become influential in the development of the city. Relations with the Lenape deteriorated, in part because of the colonialist's mismanagement and misunderstanding of the indigenous people, and led to series of raids and reprisals and the virtual destruction of the settlement on the west bank. During Kieft's War, approximately eighty Lenapes were killed by the Dutch in a massacre at Pavonia on the night of February 25, 1643.

Scattered communities of farmsteads characterized the Dutch settlements at Pavonia: Communipaw, Harsimus, Paulus Hook, Hoebuck, Awiehaken, Pamrapo, and other lands "behind Kill van Kull". The village of Bergen (located inside a palisaded garrison) was established on what is now Bergen Square in 1660 and officially chartered on September 5, 1661, as the state's first local civil government. As a result, it is regarded as the first permanent settlement and oldest municipality in what would become the state of New Jersey. In addition, the oldest surviving houses in Jersey City are of Dutch origin including the Newkirk House (1690), the Van Vorst Farmhouse (1740), and the Van Wagenen House (1740).

19th century
In 1804, Alexander Hamilton, now a private citizen, was focused on increasing manufacturing in the greater New York City area. To that end, he helped to create the Associates of the Jersey Company which would lay the groundwork for modern Jersey City through private development. The consortium behind the company were predominantly Federalists who, like Hamilton, had been swept out of power in the election of 1800 by Thomas Jefferson and other Democratic-Republicans. Large tracts of land in Paulus Hook were purchased by the company with the titles owned by Anthony Dey, who was from a prominent old Dutch family, and his two cousins, Colonel Richard Varick, the former mayor of New York City (1789–1801), and Jacob Radcliff, a Justice of the New York Supreme Court who would later become mayor of New York City (twice) from 1810 to 1811 and again from 1815 – 1818. They laid out the city squares and streets that still characterize the neighborhood, giving them names also seen in Lower Manhattan or after war heroes (Grove, Varick, Mercer, Wayne, Monmouth and Montgomery among them).

Despite Hamilton's untimely death in August 1804, the Association carried on, though the enterprise was mired in a legal dispute between New York City and the state of New Jersey over who owned the waterfront. The unresolved dispute would continue until the Treaty of 1834 where New York City formally ceded control of Jersey City to New Jersey. Over that time though, the Jersey Company applied to the New Jersey Legislature to incorporate the Town of Jersey. The legislature enacted "An Act to incorporate the City of Jersey, in the County of Bergen" on January 28, 1820. Under the provision, five freeholders (including Varick, Dey, and Radcliff) were to be chosen as "the Board of Selectmen of Jersey City," thereby establishing the first governing body of the emerging municipality. The city was reincorporated on January 23, 1829, and again on February 22, 1838, at which time it became completely independent of North Bergen and was given its present name. On February 22, 1840, it became part of the newly created Hudson County.

During the 19th century, former slaves reached Jersey City on one of the four routes of the Underground Railroad that led to the city.

Soon after the Civil War, the idea arose of uniting all of the towns of Hudson County east of the Hackensack River into one municipality. A bill was approved by the state legislature on April 2, 1869, with a special election to be held on October 5, 1869. An element of the bill provide that only contiguous towns could be consolidated. While a majority of the voters across the county approved the merger, the only municipalities that had approved the consolidation plan and that adjoined Jersey City were Hudson City and Bergen City. The consolidation began on March 17, 1870, taking effect on May 3, 1870. Three years later the present outline of Jersey City was completed when Greenville agreed to merge into the Greater Jersey City.

In the late 1880s, three passenger railroad terminals opened in Jersey City next to the Hudson River (Pavonia Terminal, Exchange Place and Communipaw). Tens of millions of immigrants passed through these stations as they made their way westward from Ellis Island into the United States. The railroads transformed the geography of the city by building the Erie Cut as well as several large freight rail yards.

20th and 21st centuries
Jersey City was a dock and manufacturing town for much of the 19th and 20th centuries. Much like New York City, Jersey City has always been a destination for new immigrants to the United States. In its heyday before World War II, German, Irish, and Italian immigrants found work at Colgate, Chloro or Dixon Ticonderoga. In 1908, the first permanent disinfection system for drinking water in the U.S. was installed on the water supply for the city by John L. Leal. The Hudson Tubes opened in 1911, allowing passengers to take the train to Manhattan as an alternative to the extensive ferry system. The Black Tom explosion occurred on July 30, 1916, as an act of sabotage on American ammunition supplies by German agents to prevent the materials from being used by the Allies in World War I.

From 1917 to 1947, Jersey City was governed by Mayor Frank Hague. Originally elected as a candidate supporting reform in governance, the Jersey City History website says his name is "synonymous with the early twentieth century urban American blend of political favoritism and social welfare known as bossism". Hague ran the city with an iron fist while, at the same time, molding governors, United States senators, and judges to his whims. Boss Hague was known to be loud and vulgar, but dressed in a stylish manner, earning him the nickname "King Hanky-Panky". In his later years in office, Hague would often dismiss his enemies as "reds" or "commies". Hague lived like a millionaire, despite having an annual salary that never exceeded $8,500. He was able to maintain a fourteen-room duplex apartment in Jersey City, a suite at the Plaza Hotel in Manhattan, and a palatial summer home in the seaside community of Deal, and travel to Europe yearly in the royal suites of the best ocean liners.

After Hague's retirement from politics, a series of mayors including John V. Kenny, Thomas J. Whelan and Thomas F. X. Smith attempted to take control of Hague's organization, usually under the mantle of political reform. None were able to duplicate the level of power held by Hague, but the city and the county remained notorious for political corruption for years. By the 1970s the city experienced a period of urban decline that saw many of its wealthy residents leave for the suburbs, due to rising crime, civil unrest, political corruption, and economic hardship. From 1950 to 1980, Jersey City lost 75,000 residents, and from 1975 to 1982, it lost 5,000 jobs, or 9% of its workforce.

Beginning in the 1980s, development of the waterfront in an area previously occupied by rail yards and factories helped to stir the beginnings of a renaissance for Jersey City. The rapid construction of numerous high-rise buildings increased the population and led to the development of the Exchange Place financial district, also known as "Wall Street West", one of the largest financial centers in the United States. Large financial institutions such as UBS, Goldman Sachs, Chase Bank, Citibank, and Merrill Lynch occupy prominent buildings on the Jersey City waterfront, some of which are among the tallest buildings in New Jersey. Simultaneous to this building boom, the light-rail network was developed. With  of office space as of 2011, it has the nation's 12th-largest downtown.

City Ordinance 13.097, passed in October 2013, requires employers with ten or more employees to offer up to five paid sick days a year. The bill impacts all businesses employing workers who work at least 80 hours a calendar year in Jersey City.

Geography

Jersey City is the seat of Hudson County and the second-most-populous city in New Jersey. According to the United States Census Bureau, the city had a total area of 21.13 square miles (54.74 km2), including 14.74 square miles (38.19 km2) of land and 6.39 square miles (16.55 km2) of water (30.24%). As of the 1990 census, it had the smallest land area of the 100 most populous cities in the United States. 

Jersey City is bordered to the east by the Hudson River, to the north by Secaucus, North Bergen, Union City and Hoboken, to the west, across the Hackensack River, by Kearny and Newark, and to the south by Bayonne. 

Jersey City includes most of Ellis Island (the parts awarded to New Jersey by the 1998 U.S. Supreme Court in the case of New Jersey v. New York). Liberty Island is surrounded by Jersey City waters in the Upper New York Bay. Given their proximity and accessibility by rapid transit to Manhattan, Jersey City and Hudson County are sometimes referred to as New York City's Sixth borough.

Jersey City (and most of Hudson County) is located on the peninsula known as Bergen Neck, with a waterfront on the east at the Hudson River and New York Bay and on the west at the Hackensack River and Newark Bay. Its north–south axis corresponds with the ridge of Bergen Hill, the emergence of the Hudson Palisades. The city is the site of some of the earliest European settlements in North America, which grew into each other rather than expanding from a central point. This growth and the topography greatly influenced the development of the sections of the city and its various neighborhoods.

Neighborhoods
The city is divided into six wards.

Bergen-Lafayette
Bergen-Lafayette, formerly Bergen City, New Jersey, lies between Greenville to the south and McGinley Square to the north, while bordering Liberty State Park and Downtown to the east and the West Side neighborhood to the west. Communipaw Avenue, Bergen Avenue, Martin Luther King Drive, and Ocean Avenue are main thoroughfares. The former Jersey City Medical Center complex, a cluster of Art Deco buildings on a rise in the center of the city, has been converted into residential complexes called The Beacon. Completed in 2016 at a cost of $38 million, Berry Lane Park is located along Garfield Avenue in the northern section of Bergen-Lafayette; covering , it the largest municipal park in Jersey City.

Downtown Jersey City
Downtown Jersey City is the area from the Hudson River westward to the Newark Bay Extension of the New Jersey Turnpike (Interstate 78) and the New Jersey Palisades; it is also bounded by Hoboken to the north and Liberty State Park to the south.

Historic Downtown is an area of mostly low-rise buildings to the west of the waterfront that is highly desirable due to its proximity to local amenities and Manhattan. It includes the neighborhoods of Van Vorst Park and Hamilton Park, which are both square parks surrounded by brownstones. This historic downtown also includes Paulus Hook, the Village and Harsimus Cove neighborhoods. Newark Avenue & Grove Street, are the main thoroughfares in Downtown Jersey City, both have seen a lot of development and the surrounding neighborhoods have many stores and restaurants. The Grove Street PATH station is in the process of being renovated and a number of new residential buildings are being built around the stop, including a proposed 50-story building at 90 Columbus. Historic Downtown is home to many cultural attractions including the Jersey City Museum, the Hudson and Manhattan Railroad Powerhouse (planned to become a museum and artist housing) and the Harsimus Stem Embankment along Sixth Street, which a citizens' movement is working to turn into public parkland that would be modeled after the High Line in Manhattan.

Newport and Exchange Place are redeveloped waterfront areas consisting mostly of residential towers, hotels and office buildings that are among the tallest buildings in the city. Newport is a planned mixed-use community, built on the old Erie Lackawanna Railway yards, made up of residential rental towers, condominiums, office buildings, a marina, schools, restaurants, hotels, Newport Centre Mall, a waterfront walkway, transportation facilities, and on-site parking for more than 15,000 vehicles. Newport had a hand in the renaissance of Jersey City although, before ground was broken, much of the downtown area had already begun a steady climb (much like Hoboken).

The Heights

The Heights or Jersey City Heights is a district in the north end of Jersey City atop the New Jersey Palisades overlooking Hoboken to the east and Croxton in the Meadowlands to the west. Previously the city of Hudson City, The Heights was incorporated into Jersey City in 1869. The southern border of The Heights is generally considered to be north of Bergen Arches and The Divided Highway, while Paterson Plank Road in Washington Park is its main northern boundary. Transfer Station is just over the city line. Its postal area ZIP Code is 07307. The Heights mostly contains two- and three-family houses and low rise apartment buildings, and is similar to North Hudson architectural style and neighborhood character.

Journal Square 
Journal Square is a mixed-use district. It takes its name from The Jersey Journal, the newspaper whose headquarters were located there from 1911 to 2013. The square was created in 1923 when the city condemned and demolished the offices of the Jersey Journal, creating a broad intersection with Hudson Boulevard which itself had been widened in 1908. McGinley Square is located in close proximity to Journal Square, and has been described as an extension of it.

Greenville 
Greenville is on the south end of Jersey City. In the 2010s, the neighborhood underwent a revitalization. Considered an affordable neighborhood in the New York City area, a number of Ultra-Orthodox Jews and young families purchased homes and built a substantial community there, attracted by housing that costs less than half of comparable homes in New York City. In a December 2019 shooting incident, three bystanders were killed in a kosher market in Greenville. The two assailants, who had earlier killed a police detective, were also shot and killed.

Climate
The climate in this area is characterized by hot, humid summers and generally mild to cool winters. According to the Köppen climate classification system, Jersey City has a humid subtropical climate in which, its climate is similar to its parallel cities like Newark and New York City.

Demographics

As of the 2020 census, Jersey City had a population of 292,449, and a population density of 17,954.6 persons per square mile. At the 2020 census, Jersey City experienced an increase of 44,852 residents (18.1%) from its 2010 census population of 247,597. Since it was believed the earlier population was under-counted, the 2010 census was anticipated with the possibility that Jersey City might become the state's most populated city, surpassing Newark. The city hired an outside firm to contest the results, citing the fact that development in the city between 2000 and 2010 substantially increased the number of housing units and that new populations may have been under-counted by as many as 30,000 residents based on the city's calculations. Preliminary findings indicated that 19,000 housing units went uncounted.

Per the American Community Survey's 2014–2018 estimates, Jersey City's age distribution was 7.7% of the population under 5, 13.2% between 6–18, 69% – from 19 to 64, and 10.1% who were 65 years of age or older. The median age 34.2 years. Females made up 50.8% of the population and there were 100.1 males per 100 females. 86.5% of the population graduated high school, while 44.9% of the population had a bachelor's degree or higher. 7.1% of residents under 65 were disabled, while 15.9% of residents live without health insurance.

There were 110,801 housing units and 102,353 households in 2018. The average household size was 2.57. The average per capita income was $36,453, and the median household income was $62,739. 18.7% of residents lived below the poverty line. 67.9% of residents 16+ were within the civilian labor force. The mean travel time to work for residents was 36.8 minutes. 28.6% of housing units are owner-occupied, with the median value of the homes being $344,200. The median gross rent in the city was $1,271.

Race and ethnicity 

Jersey City is one of the most ethnically diverse cities in the world. The city is a major port of entry for immigration to the United States and a major employment center at the approximate core of the New York City metropolitan area; and given its proximity to Manhattan, Jersey City has evolved a globally cosmopolitan ambiance of its own, demonstrating a robust and growing demographic and cultural diversity with respect to metrics including nationality, religion, race, and domiciliary partnership.

There were an estimated 55,493 non-Hispanic whites in Jersey City, according to the 2013–2017 American Community Survey, representing a 4.2% increase from 53,236 non-Hispanic whites enumerated in the 2010 United States census.

An estimated 63,788 African Americans resided in Jersey City, or 24.0% of the city's population in 2017, representing a slight decrease from 64,002 African Americans enumerated in the 2010 United States census. This is in contrast with Hudson County overall, where there were an estimated 84,114 African Americans, according to the 2013–2017 American Community Survey, representing a 2.3% increase from 83,925 African Americans enumerated in the county in the 2010 United States census. However, modest growth in the African immigrant population, most notably the growing Nigerian American and Kenyan American populations in Jersey City, is partially offsetting the decline in the city's American-born black population, which as a whole has been experiencing an exodus from northern New Jersey to the Southern United States. Approximately 76,637 Latino and Hispanic Americans lived in Jersey City, composing 28.8% of the population in 2017, representing a 12.3% increase from 68,256 Latino or Hispanic Americans enumerated in the 2010 United States census. Stateside Puerto Ricans, making up a third of the city's Latin American or Hispanic population, constituted the largest Hispanic group in Jersey City. While Cuban Americans are not as highly concentrated in Jersey City as they are in northern Hudson County, Jersey City has hosted the annual Cuban Parade and Festival of New Jersey at Exchange Place on its downtown waterfront since it was established in 2001.

An estimated 67,526 Asian Americans live in Jersey City, constituting 25.4% of the city's population, representing a 15.2% increase from 58,595 Asian Americans enumerated in the 2010 United States census. India Square, also known as "Little India" or "Little Bombay," home to the highest concentration of Asian Indians in the Western Hemisphere, is a rapidly growing Indian American ethnic enclave in Jersey City. Indian Americans constituted 10.9% of the overall population of Jersey City in 2010, the highest proportion of any major U.S. city. India Square has been home to the largest outdoor Navratri festivities in New Jersey as well as several Hindu temples; while an annual, color-filled spring Holi festival has taken place in Jersey City since 1992, centered upon India Square and attracting significant participation and international media attention. In 2017 there were an estimated 31,578 Indian Americans in Jersey City, representing a 16.5% increase from 27,111 Indian Americans enumerated in the 2010 United States census.

Filipino Americans, with 16,610 residents, made up 6.2% of Jersey City's population. The Five Corners district is home to a thriving Filipino community and Jersey City's Little Manila, which is the second-largest Asian American subgroup in the city. A variety of Filipino restaurants, shippers and freighters, doctors' offices, bakeries, stores, and an office of The Filipino Channel have made Newark Avenue their home. The largest Filipino-owned grocery store on the East Coast of the United States, Phil-Am Food, has been there since 1973. An array of Filipino-owned businesses can also be found at the section of West Side of Jersey City, where many of its residents are of Filipino descent. In 2006, a Red Ribbon pastry shop, one of the Philippines' most famous food chains, opened its first branch on the East Coast in the Garden State. Manila Avenue in Downtown Jersey City was named for the Philippine capital city because of the many Filipinos who built their homes on this street during the 1970s. A memorial, dedicated to the Filipino American veterans of the Vietnam War, was built in a small square on Manila Avenue. A park and statue dedicated to Jose P. Rizal, a national hero of the Philippines, is located in downtown Jersey City. Jersey City is the host of the annual Philippine-American Friendship Day Parade, an event that occurs yearly in June, on its last Sunday. The City Hall of Jersey City raises the Philippine flag in correlation to this event and as a tribute to the contributions of the Filipino community. The Santacruzan Procession along Manila Avenue has taken place since 1977.

Behind English and Spanish, Tagalog is the third-most-common language spoken in Jersey City.

Jersey City was home to an estimated 9,379 Chinese Americans in 2017, representing a notably rapid growth of 66.2% from the 5,643 Chinese Americans enumerated in the 2010 United States census. Chinese nationals have also been obtaining EB-5 immigrant visas by investing US$500,000 apiece in new Downtown Jersey City residential skyscrapers.

New Jersey's largest Vietnamese American population resides in Jersey City. There were an estimated 1,813 Vietnamese Americans in Jersey City, according to the 2013–2017 American Community Survey, representing a 12.8% increase from 1,607 Vietnamese Americans enumerated in the 2010 United States census.

Arab Americans numbered an estimated 18,628 individuals in Hudson County per the 2013–2017 American Community Survey, representing 2.8% of the county's total population. Arab Americans are the second- highest percentage in New Jersey after Passaic County. Arab Americans are most concentrated in Jersey City, led by Egyptian Americans, including the largest population of Coptic Christians in the United States.

Sexual orientation and gender identity 

There were 2,726 same-sex couples in Hudson County in 2010, with Jersey City being the hub, prior to the commencement of same-sex marriages in New Jersey on October 21, 2013.

Religion 
Nearly 59.6% of Jersey City's inhabitants are religious adherents, of which 46.2% are Catholic Christians and 7.3% are Protestant Christians. Muslims constituted 3.4% of religious adherents in Jersey City, with local Latino and Hispanics being the largest demographic converting to Islam after Black or African Americans.

Eastern religions including Buddhism, Hinduism, and Sikhism make up 1.5% of the city's religious demographic, with Judaism at 0.6%. Jersey City has a growing Orthodox Jewish population, centered in the Greenville neighborhood.

Economy

Jersey City is a regional employment center with over 100,000 private and public sector jobs, which creates a daytime swell in population. Many jobs are in the financial and service sectors, as well as in shipping, logistics, and retail.

Jersey City's tax base grew by $136 million in 2017, giving Jersey City the largest municipal tax base in the State of New Jersey. As part of a 2017 revaluation, the city's property tax base is expected to increase from $6.2 billion to $26 billion.

Wall Street West
Jersey City's Hudson River waterfront, from Exchange Place to Newport, is known as Wall Street West and has over 13 million square feet of Class A office space. One third of the private sector jobs in the city are in the financial services sector: more than 60% are in the securities industry, 20% are in banking and 8% in insurance. Jersey City is home to the headquarters of Verisk Analytics and Lord Abbett, a privately held money management firm. Companies such as Computershare, ADP, IPC Systems, and Fidelity Investments also conduct operations in the city. In 2014, Forbes magazine moved its headquarters to the district, having been awarded a $27 million tax grant in exchange for bringing 350 jobs to the city over a ten-year period.

Retail

Jersey City has several shopping districts, some of which are traditional main streets for their respective neighborhoods, such as Central, Danforth, and West Side Avenues. Journal Square is a major commercial district. Newport Mall is a regional shopping area.

Portions of the city are part of an Urban Enterprise Zone (UEZ). Jersey City was selected in 1983 as one of the initial group of 10 zones chosen to participate in the program. In addition to other benefits to encourage employment and investment within the Zone, shoppers can take advantage of a reduced 3.3125% sales tax rate (half of the 6.625% rate charged statewide) at eligible merchants. Established in November 1992, the city's Urban Enterprise Zone status expires in November 2023. About one third of Jersey City is included in the state's largest Urban Enterprise Zone.

Port Jersey
Port Jersey is an intermodal freight transport facility that includes a container terminal located on the Upper New York Bay in the Port of New York and New Jersey. The municipal border of the Hudson County cities of Jersey City and Bayonne runs along the long pier extending into the bay.

The north end of the facility houses the Greenville Yard, a rail yard located on a manmade peninsula that was built in the early 1900s by the Pennsylvania Railroad,

The central area of the facility contains GCT Bayonne, a major post-panamax shipping facility operated by Global Container Terminals that underwent a major expansion in June 2014. The largest ship ever to call at the Port of New York-New Jersey, the MOL Benefactor, docked at Port Jersey in July 2016 after sailing from China through the newly widened Panama Canal.

Other
Goya Foods, which had been headquartered in adjacent Secaucus, opened a new headquarters including a  warehouse and distribution center in Jersey City in April 2015.

In 2014, Paul Fireman proposed a 95-story tower for Jersey City that would have included a casino. The project, which was endorsed by Mayor Steven Fulop, would cost an estimated $4.6 billion. In February 2014, New Jersey State Senate President Stephen Sweeney argued that Jersey City, among other distressed cities, could benefit from a casino—were construction of one outside of Atlantic City eventually permitted by New Jersey.

In 2020, Merck & Co spin-off Organon International agreed to locate its headquarters at Goldman Sachs Tower.

Art and culture
Based upon a 2011 survey of census data on the number of artists as a percentages of the population, The Atlantic magazine called Jersey City the 10th-most-artistic city in the United States.

Notable landmarks

Statue of Liberty National Monument, Ellis Island and Liberty Island (Liberty Island and part of Ellis Island are located in New York; but closer to the Jersey shore.)
Liberty Science Center
 The Katyń Memorial by well-known Polish-American artist Andrzej Pitynski on Exchange Place is the first memorial of its kind to be raised on American soil to honor the dead of the Katyń Forest Massacre.
 The Colgate Clock, promoted by Colgate-Palmolive as the largest in the world, sits in Jersey City and faces Lower New York Bay and Lower Manhattan (it is clearly visible from Battery Park in lower Manhattan).

 The Landmark Loew's Jersey Theatre, one of the five Loew's Wonder Theatres constructed in the 1920s and the only one located outside of New York City, is located in Journal Square. Currently presenting classic films, live performances, and events while the theatre undergoes restoration by volunteers.
 The White Eagle Hall is a renovated and re-opened historic theater. Constructed in 1910, it had served as the practice gym for the Saint Anthony High School Friars basketball program.

Museums and libraries

The Jersey City Free Public Library has a Main Library and nine branches.

Liberty State Park is home to Central Railroad of New Jersey Terminal, the Interpretive Center, and Liberty Science Center, an interactive science and learning center. The center, which first opened in 1993 as New Jersey's first major state science museum, has science exhibits, the world's largest IMAX Dome theater, numerous educational resources, and the original Hoberman sphere. From the park, ferries travel to both Ellis Island and the Immigration Museum and Liberty Island, site of the Statue of Liberty.

The Jersey City Museum, Mana Contemporary, and the Museum of Russian Art, which specializes in Soviet Nonconformist Art, include permanent collections and special exhibits. Some stations of the Hudson Bergen Light Rail feature public art exhibitions, including those at Exchange Place, Danforth Avenue and Martin Luther King Drive station.

Festivals and events 
Jersey City is home to several annual visual and performing arts festivals, fairs, and other events. These include Jersey City Art & Studio Tour (JCAST), a city-sponsored visual art showcase founded in 1990, Art Fair 14C, a non-profit juried exhibition for New Jersey artists, and Your Move Modern Dance Festival, which was founded in 2010 and continues to be produced by Art House Productions. Jersey City has also hosted JC Fridays, a city-wide quarterly seasonal arts festival organized by Art House Productions each March, June, September, and December since 2006. Art House Productions also produces the Jersey City Comedy Festival (formerly known as the 6th Borough Comedy Festival), which presents stand up, improv, and sketch comedy.

Since 1992, the Hudson Shakespeare Company has been the resident Shakespeare festival of Hudson County performing a free Shakespeare production for each month of the summer throughout various parks in the city. The group regularly performs at Hamilton Park (9th Street & Jersey Avenue), Van Vorst Park (Jersey Avenue & Montgomery Street), and The Historic Jersey City and Harsimus Cemetery (435 Newark Avenue).

The Golden Door Film Festival has taken place since 2011.

In literature
The American poet Wallace Stevens described the city as a place where "the deer and the dachshund are one."

Government

Local

Jersey City is governed under the Faulkner Act (mayor–council) form of municipal government.  The city is one of 71 municipalities (of the 564) statewide that use this form of government. The governing body is comprised of the Mayor and the nine-member City Council. The city council is comprised of six members elected from wards and three elected at-large, all elected to concurrent four-year terms on a non-partisan basis as part of the November general election. Ward boundaries will be redrawn based on the results of the 2020 United States census to rebalance wards based on population changes.

, the mayor is Steven Fulop, whose term of office ends December 31, 2025. Members of the City Council are Council President Joyce Watterman (at large), Richard Boggiano (Ward C – Journal Square), Amy M. DeGise (at large), Frank E. Gilmore (Ward F – Bergen/Lafayette), Mira Prinz-Arey (Ward B – West Side), Denise Ridley (Ward A – Greenville), Daniel Rivera (at large), Yousef J. Saleh (Ward D – The Heights) and James Solomon (Ward E – Downtown), all of whom are serving concurrent terms of office that end December 31, 2025.

In April 2020, Yousef J. Saleh was appointed to fill the Ward D seat that became vacant following the death earlier that month of Michael Yun from complications related to COVID-19; Saleh served on an interim basis until the November 2020 general election, when voters chose him to serve the balance of the term of office.

The Business Administrator is John J. Metro; the City Clerk is Sean J. Gallagher.

Federal, state and county representation
Jersey City is split between the 8th and 10th Congressional Districts and is part of New Jersey's 31st and 33rd state legislative districts. Prior to the 2011 reapportionment following the 2010 census, Jersey City had been in the 31st, 32nd and the 33rd state legislative districts. The split that went into effect in 2013 placed 111,678 residents living in the city's north and east in the 8th District, while 139,519 residents in the southwest portion of the city were placed in the 10th District.

  

 

The city encompasses three Hudson County commissioner districts in their entirety, while three others are shared with adjacent municipalities.

Politics
As of March 23, 2011, there was a total of 120,229 registered voters in Jersey City, of whom 58,194 (48.4%) were registered as Democrats, 7,655 (6.4%) were registered as Republicans, and 54,293 (45.2%) were registered as Unaffiliated. There were 87 voters registered to other parties.

In the 2012 presidential election, Democrat Barack Obama received 85.5% of the vote (64,052 cast), ahead of Republican Mitt Romney with 13.5% (10,120 votes), and other candidates with 1.0% (751 votes), among the 75,506 ballots cast by the city's 133,197 registered voters (583 ballots were spoiled), for a turnout of 56.7%. In the 2008 presidential election, Democrat Barack Obama received 81.8% of the vote (65,780 cast), ahead of Republican John McCain with 16.8% (13,529 votes) and other candidates with 0.7% (584 votes), among the 80,381 ballots cast by the city's 139,158 registered voters, for a turnout of 57.8%. In the 2004 presidential election, Democrat John Kerry received 74.5% of the vote (52,979 ballots cast), out polling Republican George W. Bush with 22.8% (16,216 votes) and other candidates with 0.5% (559 votes), among the 71,130 ballots cast by the city's 119,723 registered voters, for a turnout percentage of 59.4.

In the 2013 gubernatorial election, Democrat Barbara Buono received 66.5% of the vote (20,421 cast), ahead of Republican Chris Christie with 31.8% (9,784 votes), and other candidates with 1.7% (514 votes), among the 32,347 ballots cast by the city's 139,265 registered voters (1,628 ballots were spoiled), for a turnout of 23.2%. In the 2009 gubernatorial election, Democrat Jon Corzine received 76.2% of the vote (29,817 ballots cast), ahead of Republican Chris Christie with 18.7% (7,336 votes), Independent Chris Daggett with 3.2% (1,263 votes) and other candidates with 0.9% (371 votes), among the 39,143 ballots cast by the city's 120,269 registered voters, yielding a 32.5% turnout.

Emergency services
 The Jersey City Fire Department has 667 uniformed firefighters and is the state's largest municipal fire department. Established as a volunteer department in 1829, the department became a paid professional organization in 1871. Jersey City is a member of the Metro USAR Strike Team, which is comprised of nine north Jersey fire departments.
 The Jersey City Police Department has more than 950 sworn officers. The creation of the department dates back to 1829 with the first appointment of watchmen. The Patrol Division is divided into four districts including the North, East, West and South areas of the city.

Education

Colleges and universities

Jersey City is home to New Jersey City University and Saint Peter's University.

Hudson County Community College is a junior college located in the Journal Square area offering courses to help students transition into a larger university.

The Newark-based New Jersey Institute of Technology has an annex at 101 Hudson Street. The University of Phoenix has a facility at Newport, and Rutgers University offers MBA classes at Harborside Financial Center.

Public schools

The Jersey City Public Schools serve students in pre-kindergarten through twelfth grade. The district is one of 31 former Abbott districts statewide that were established pursuant to the decision by the New Jersey Supreme Court in Abbott v. Burke which are now referred to as "SDA Districts" based on the requirement for the state to cover all costs for school building and renovation projects in these districts under the supervision of the New Jersey Schools Development Authority. As of the 2017–18 school year, the district, comprised of 38 schools, had an enrollment of 29,634 students and 2,326.0 classroom teachers (on an FTE basis), for a student–teacher ratio of 12.7:1.

High schools in the district (with 2017–18 enrollment data from the National Center for Education Statistics) are
William L. Dickinson High School Academy of the Sciences (1,780; 9–12),
James J. Ferris High School Academy of International Enterprise (1,327; 9–12),
Infinity Institute (257; 6–12),
Innovation High School (319; 9–12),
Liberty High School (188; 9–12),
Lincoln High School Academy of Governance and Social Sciences (659; 9–12),
Dr. Ronald E. McNair Academic High School (683; 9–12),
Renaissance Institute (9–12), and
Henry Snyder High School Academy of the Arts (804; 9–12).

Dr. Ronald E. McNair Academic High School was the first-ranked public high school in New Jersey out of 322 schools statewide, in New Jersey Monthly magazine's September 2010 cover story on the state's "Top Public High Schools", after being ranked second in 2008 out of 316 schools. and was selected as 41st best high school in the United States in Newsweek magazine's national 2011 survey. William L. Dickinson High School is the oldest high school in the city and one of the largest schools in Hudson County in terms of student population. Opened in 1906 as the Jersey City High School it is one of the oldest school sites in the city, it is a four-story Beaux-Arts building located on a hilltop facing the Hudson River.

Among Jersey City's elementary and middle schools is Academy I Middle School and Frank R. Conwell Middle School #4, which is part of the Academic Enrichment Program for Gifted Students. Another school is Alexander D. Sullivan P.S. #30, an ESL magnet school in the Greenville district, which serves nearly 800 Pre-k through 5th grade students.

The Hudson County Schools of Technology (which also has campuses in North Bergen and Secaucus) has a campus in Jersey City, which includes County Prep High School.

Jersey City also has 12 charter schools, which are run under a special charter granted by the Commissioner of the New Jersey Department of Education, including the Mathematics, Engineering, Technology and Science Charter School (for grades 6 – 12) and the Dr. Lena Edwards Charter School (for K-8), which were approved in January 2011. BelovED Community Charter School opened in 2012 and has purchased a half-acre parcel of land on Grand Street to make room for a new , $12 million middle school building designed to serve 240 students in sixth through ninth grades.

Private schools

Catholic schools
The Roman Catholic Archdiocese of Newark maintains a network of elementary and secondary Catholic schools that serve every area of Jersey City. Hudson Catholic Regional High School is operated by the Archdiocese, while Saint Dominic Academy and St. Peter's Preparatory School are private, religiously affiliated schools. St. Mary High School closed in June 2011 due to declining enrollment. St. Anthony High School, a prep basketball powerhouse known for its success under Bob Hurley and his 26 state championships in 39 years as a coach, closed in June 2017 due to declining funding and enrollment.

Catholic K-8 elementary schools include Our Lady of Czestochowa School, Sacred Heart School, Saint Aloysius Elementary Academy, St. Joseph School and St. Nicholas School. In 2015, Our Lady of Czestochowa School was one of 15 schools in New Jersey, and one of six private schools, recognized as a National Blue Ribbon School in the exemplary high performing category by the United States Department of Education.

In the face of declining enrollment and rising expenses, the Newark Archdiocese closed Our Lady of Mercy Academy (founded in 1964) and Resurrection School at the end of the 2012–13 school year. St. Anne School closed at the end of the 2011–12 school year after 112 years, as enrollment declined from 700 students in 1976 to 240 in 2010–11 and 188 in the school's final year of operation.

Other private schools
Other private high schools in Jersey City include First Christian Pentecostal Academy and Stevens Cooperative School. Kenmare High School is operated through the York Street Project as part of an effort to reduce rates of poverty in households headed by women, through a program that offers small class sizes, individualized learning and development of life skills. The French American Academy, located in the century-old three-story building of the former St. Mary's High School, is a private bilingual school PK-3. A number of other private schools are also available. Genesis Educational Center is a private Christian school located in downtown Jersey City for ages newborn through 8th grade. The Jersey City Art School is a private art school located in downtown Jersey City for all ages.

Media
Jersey City is located in the New York media market, and most of its daily papers are available for sale or delivery. The daily newspaper The Jersey Journal, formerly located at its namesake Journal Square, covers Hudson County, its morning daily, Hudson Dispatch now defunct. The Jersey City Reporter is part of The Hudson Reporter group of local weeklies. The Jersey City Independent is a web-only news outlet that covers politics and culture in the city. The River View Observer is another weekly published in the city and distributed throughout the county. Another countywide weekly, El Especialito, also serves the city. The Jersey City Independent is an online newspaper covering Jersey City and surrounding municipalities. It also publishes JCI Magazine, a print quarterly magazine. The Daily News maintains extensive publishing and distribution facilities at Liberty Industrial Park.

WSNR AM 620 is licensed to Jersey City.

WFMU 91.1FM (WMFU 90.1 FM in the Hudson Valley), the longest-running freeform radio station in the United States, moved to Jersey City in 1998.

Jersey City was the filming location for the debut season of the 2012 reality television series Snooki & JWoww, a spinoff of Jersey Shore that starred Nicole "Snooki" Polizzi and Jennifer "JWoww" Farley living at a former firehouse at 38 Mercer Street at Grove Street in Downtown Jersey City.

Transportation

Of all Jersey City commuters, 8.17% walk to work, and 46.62% take public transit. This is the second highest percentage of public transit riders of any city with a population of 100,000+ in the United States, behind only New York City and ahead of Washington, D.C. 40.67% of Jersey City households do not own an automobile, the second-highest of all cities in the United States with 50,000 to 250,000 residents.

Air

 Newport Helistop Heliport, at Hudson River at Newport

Mass transit

Rail

 Hudson-Bergen Light Rail: One of the most popular forms of transportation in the city. Of the 24 HBLR stations that connect its three terminus points, 13 are located in Jersey City.
 PATH: 24-hour rapid transit system with four stations in Jersey City: Exchange Place, Newport, Grove Street, and Journal Square. Service goes to Hoboken Terminal in Hoboken, 33rd Street station in Midtown Manhattan, World Trade Center in Lower Manhattan, and Newark Penn Station in Newark. At the last station, inter-state Amtrak connections can be made.
 Hoboken Terminal, straddling the city's northeast corner: Main Line (to Suffern, and in partnership with MTA/Metro-North, express service to Port Jervis), Bergen County Line, and Pascack Valley Line, all via Secaucus Junction (where transfer is possible to Northeast Corridor Line); Montclair-Boonton Line and Morris and Essex Lines (both via Newark Broad Street Station); North Jersey Coast Line (limited service as Waterfront Connection via Newark Penn Station to Long Branch and Bay Head); Raritan Valley Line (limited service via Newark Penn).

Bus
The Journal Square Transportation Center, Exchange Place and Hoboken Terminal are major origination/destination points for buses. Service is available to numerous points in Jersey City, Hudson County, and some suburban areas as well as to Newark on the 1, 2, 6, 10, 22, 64, 67, 68, 80, 81, 82, 83, 84, 85, 86, 87, 88, 123, 125, 319 lines.

Also serving Jersey City are various lines operated by Academy Bus and A&C Bus. Increased use of jitneys, locally known as dollar vans, has greatly affected travel patterns in Hudson County, leading to decreased bus ridership on traditional bus lines. After studies examining existing systems and changes in public transportation usage patterns it was determined that a Journal Square-Bayonne bus rapid transit system should be investigated. In 2012, the Board of Chosen Freeholders authorized the identification of possible BRT corridors.

Since 2016, two Taiwanese airlines, China Airlines and EVA Air, have provided private bus services to and from John F. Kennedy International Airport in New York City for customers based in New Jersey. These bus services stop in Jersey City.

Via on-demand public transit 
In February 2020, the city launched its on-demand transit system in partnership with Via Transportation. The city-run microtransit service, Via Jersey City, complements and extends the existing public transit networks, providing better connections between residential neighborhoods, business districts, government facilities, PATH stations, and ferry and light rail stops in the north and south regions of the city. Commuters can use the Via app to book an on-demand ride from their smartphone. As of March 2021, Via Jersey City was expanding to provide a weekend service.

Water
NY Waterway ferries operate between Harborside, Paulus Hook Ferry Terminal, Liberty Harbor and Port Liberté to Manhattan at Battery Park City Ferry Terminal, Pier 11/Wall Street, and West Midtown Ferry Terminal, where free transfer is available to a variety of "loop" buses.
Statue Cruises provides service to and between Ellis Island and Liberty Island
Liberty Water Taxi operates ferries between Liberty Landing Marina, Warren Street and the Battery Park City Ferry Terminal at Brookfield Place (New York City).

Road

 Holland Tunnel: From Boyle Plaza in downtown Jersey City to its eastern terminus at Canal Street, Manhattan (carries Interstate 78 and Route 139)
 Highways include the New Jersey Turnpike Extension (Interstate 78); the Pulaski Skyway (U.S. Route 1/9), Route 7, Route 139, Route 185 and Route 440.

Bike

A part of the East Coast Greenway, a planned unbroken bike route from Maine to the Florida Keys, will travel through the city. In June 2012, part of the route was officially designated in Lincoln Park and over the Lincoln Highway Hackensack River Bridge. Both the Hudson River Waterfront Walkway and Hackensack RiverWalk are bicycle friendly.

In April 2012, the city initiated the Morris Canal Greenway Plan to investigate the establishment of a greenway, including a bicycle path, that would follow the route of the Morris Canal to the greatest extent possible. In the same month, the city established bikes lanes along the length Grove Street, originally meant to temporary. In December 2012, the city announced that Grove Street lanes would become permanent and that it would add an additional  of both dedicated and shared bike lanes.

The Harbor Ring is an initiative to create a 50-mile bike route along the Lower Hudson River, Upper New York Bay, and Kill van Kull that would incorporate bike paths in the city.

In 2013, the city simplified the application and reduced the cost for business and residences to install bike racks as well as making them obligatory for certain new construction projects.

Also in 2013, Hudson County had initiated exploration of a bike-share program.  Jersey City, Hoboken and Weehawken intended to operate the program starting in 2014 but delayed the launch due to lack of sponsorship. The revamped program officially launched on September 21, 2015, as Citi Bike with membership working in Jersey City and New York City. On May 3, 2021, Citi Bike eventually expanded to neighboring Hoboken with 15 stations and about 200 bikes.

Modal characteristics
Jersey City has a high percentage of residents who commute without a car. In 2015, 40.1 percent of city Jersey City households were without a car, which decreased to 37.1 percent in 2016. The national average was 8.7 percent in 2016. Jersey City averaged 0.85 cars per household in 2016, compared to a national average of 1.8 per household.

Notable people

Sister cities
Sister cities of Jersey City are:

Cusco, Peru (1988)
Karpathos, Greece (1992)
Changwon, South Korea (1993) 
New Delhi, India (1993)
Ahmedabad, India (1994)
Nantong, China (1994)
Ozamiz, Philippines (1995)
Jerusalem, Israel (1997)
Oviedo, Spain (1998)
Sant'Arsenio, Italy (1999)
Kolkata, India (2001)
Saint John's, Antigua and Barbuda (2002)

Palatka, Florida, United States (2016)
Gomoa West District, Ghana (2018)
Indrawati, Nepal (2018)
Beit Shemesh, Israel (2022)

See also

 Bergen Township, New Jersey (1661–1862)
 Demographics of New Jersey
 Gold Coast, New Jersey
 Northeast Megalopolis
 Timeline of Jersey City area railroads
 Transportation in New Jersey
 Van Vorst Township, New Jersey

References

Bibliography

External links

Official website
Jersey City List
VisitNJ – Jersey City
 

 
1633 establishments in North America
1838 establishments in New Jersey
1633 establishments in the Dutch Empire
Cities in Hudson County, New Jersey
County seats in New Jersey
Establishments in New Netherland
Faulkner Act (mayor–council)
New Jersey Meadowlands District
New Jersey Urban Enterprise Zones
Populated places established in 1633
Populated places established in 1838
New Jersey populated places on the Hackensack River
New Jersey populated places on the Hudson River
Populated places on the Underground Railroad
Port cities and towns in New Jersey